Jake Spencer (born 9 October 1989) is a former professional Australian rules footballer who played for the Melbourne Football Club in the Australian Football League (AFL). Spencer, a ruckman, is the first person from Townsville to be drafted and play in the AFL.

Early life
Spencer moved to Townsville at age 18 years of age where he played basketball, becoming an under 18 player. In 2003 he began to play Australian rules football and in 2007 he moved to Brisbane because:"I couldn't really get noticed in Townsville so I moved to Brisbane to get a better standard of football. If I do become the first (Townsville product) to play AFL I would be very proud of it." He completed his schooling at Brisbane Boys College and his performances with Redland Bombers in the AFL Queensland State League gained the attention of several AFL talent scouts. Spencer's uncle is Tony Kelly, chairman of the Brisbane Lions football club, one of the teams that scouted Spencer but did not select him.

AFL career

Rookie list (2008-2010)

 used its 35th selection in the 2008 Rookie Draft to recruit Spencer in 2008. His first season was spent playing in the Victorian Football League with affiliate club  where he played seven games at reserves level and 10 in the seniors. He made his NAB Cup debut on 21 February 2009 to encouraging reviews. He played his first AFL game in Round 1 2009 and managed six games for the season. After two senior games in 2010, an injury in Round 14 prematurely ended his season. At the conclusion of the 2010 season, Spencer was promoted from the rookie list to the senior list with the 96th selection in the 2010 AFL Draft.

Senior list (2011-2017)

He returned to the VFL in 2012 and started to improve his form. In 2013, he played consistently in the VFL and was named an emergency in the AFL side a number of times, but wasn't named in the 22-man side until round 13.

Throughout his AFL career, Spencer struggled to get a consistent spot in Melbourne's side, as Melbourne preferred to play only one ruckman and Max Gawn began to emerge as a great ruckman. In 2016, he wasn't able to play a single game for the Demons and remained a back-up ruckman for the club. He was delisted at the conclusion of the 2017 season.

Statistics
 Statistics are correct to the end of the 2017 season

|- style="background-color: #eaeaea"
! scope="row" style="text-align:center" | 2008
|  || 42 || 0 || — || — || — || — || — || — || — || — || — || — || — || — || — || — || — || — 
|-
! scope="row" style="text-align:center" | 2009
|  || 42 || 6 || 0 || 1 || 14 || 31 || 45 || 18 || 11 || 67 || 0.0 || 0.2 || 2.3 || 5.2 || 7.5 || 3.0 || 1.8 || 11.2
|- style="background-color: #eaeaea"
! scope="row" style="text-align:center" | 2010
|  || 42 || 2 || 0 || 0 || 2 || 8 || 10 || 4 || 2 || 24 || 0.0 || 0.0 || 1.0 || 4.0 || 5.0 || 2.0 || 1.0 || 12.0
|-
! scope="row" style="text-align:center" | 2011
|  || 42 || 0 || — || — || — || — || — || — || — || — || — || — || — || — || — || — || — || —
|- style="background-color: #eaeaea"
! scope="row" style="text-align:center" | 2012
|  || 42 || 8 || 2 || 0 || 28 || 46 || 74 || 20 || 30 || 167 || 0.3 || 0.0 || 3.5 || 5.8 || 9.3 || 2.5 || 3.8 || 20.1
|-
! scope="row" style="text-align:center" | 2013
|  || 42 || 8 || 1 || 3 || 23 || 57 || 80 || 25 || 19 || 213 || 0.1 || 0.4 || 2.9 || 7.1 || 10.0 || 3.1 || 2.4 || 26.6
|- style="background-color: #eaeaea"
! scope="row" style="text-align:center" | 2014
|  || 42 || 5 || 0 || 0 || 13 || 27 || 40 || 9 || 18 || 143 || 0.0 || 0.0 || 2.6 || 5.4 || 8.0 || 1.8 || 3.6 || 28.6
|-
! scope="row" style="text-align:center" | 2015
|  || 42 || 7 || 3 || 0 || 20 || 34 || 54 || 9 || 35 || 173 || 0.4 || 0.0 || 2.8 || 4.9 || 7.7 || 1.3 || 5.0 || 24.7
|- style="background-color: #eaeaea"
! scope="row" style="text-align:center" | 2016
|  || 33 || 0 || — || — || — || — || — || — || — || — || — || — || — || — || — || — || — || — 
|-
! scope="row" style="text-align:center" | 2017
|  || 33 || 2 || 2 || 0 || 7 || 10 || 17 || 7 || 5 || 28 || 1.0 || 0.0 || 3.5 || 5.0 || 8.5 || 3.5 || 2.5 || 14.0 
|- class="sortbottom"
! colspan=3| Career
! 38
! 8
! 4
! 107
! 213
! 320
! 89
! 120
! 815
! 0.2
! 0.1
! 2.8
! 5.6
! 8.4
! 2.3
! 3.1
! 21.4
|}

References

External links

Demon Wiki profile

Australian rules footballers from Queensland
Melbourne Football Club players
Redland Football Club players
1989 births
Living people
Sportspeople from Townsville
Casey Demons players
Sandringham Football Club players